Kim Yong-Bock (1938 – 7 April 2022) was a Korean Presbyterian and founding father of minjung theology.

Biography 
Born in Cholla province, his father died of tuberculosis when he was six years old. Along with his mother and younger sister, Kim lived with his uncle and aunt, the latter of whom was a Christian and introduced him to church. Although he considered studying theology at the Presbyterian Theological Seminary, he pursued a BA in philosophy at Yonsei University (1961). During this time, he participated in the April 19 Revolution and was imprisoned for forty days. After completing his military service, he went to Princeton Theological Seminary and completed an MDiv (1966) and a PhD (1969). His dissertation was entitled "Historical Transformation, People's Movement, and Christian Koinonia." He was ordained in the Presbyterian Church of Korea (TongHap).

Kim was involved in ecumenical work, serving as part of the Christian Conference of Asia's Commission on Theological Concern (1976–1981) and as vice-moderator of the World Council of Churches Commission for the Churches' Participation in Development (1983–1991). He also served as President of Hanil University (1992–1999).

He died on 7 April 2022, in Seoul due to colorectal cancer.

Minjung theology 
Kim was known as one of the founding fathers of minjung theology, a movement in the late-1970s that advocated the struggle for social justice. However, for Kim, the spirit of minjung theology can be traced to the Protestant translation of the Bible, which chose to use Hangul Korean characters that were accessible to Korean commoners, as opposed to the Hanja Chinese characters used by the Confucian ruling class. This enabled early Korean Protestants to be involved in political activism, such as the March 1st Movement, and gave precedence for the later development of minjung theology.

Works

Bibliography 

1938 births
2022 deaths 
Deaths from colorectal cancer 
Deaths from cancer in South Korea
Yonsei University alumni
Princeton Theological Seminary alumni
Korean Presbyterian ministers
Liberation theologians
World Christianity scholars